China competed in the 1999 Asian Winter Games which were held in the province of Kangwon, South Korea from January 30, 1999 to February 6, 1999.

See also
 China at the Asian Games
 China at the Olympics
 Sports in China

Asian Games
China at the Asian Winter Games
Nations at the 1999 Asian Winter Games